T-Bolan is a Japanese rock band which debuted in 1991. Its members were vocal Arashi Moritomo, drummer Kazuyoshi Aoki, guitarist Takeshi Gomi, and bassist Hirofumi Ueno. The name of this band was inspired by T. Rex and its vocalist Marc Bolan.

Biography
The band was formed in 1990. Their 1991 song "Hanashitaku wa Nai" (lit. "I do not want to release you") became a hit song in the cable broadcast. After this success, the band released several hit songs and albums. Their 1993 song "Osaekirenai Kono Kimochi" (lit. "Inextinguishable This Heart") was used for the ending theme of Ichigo Hakusho (in which then-unknown Namie Amuro played a role). The single reached number 1 on the Japanese Oricon weekly charts, becoming their first number-one single. However, Moritomo suffered throat problems so his doctor advised that he should give up singing. Despite this, he was forced to perform a live concert on March 26, 1995. It became their final concert. After a long hiatus, the band officially disbanded in December 1999 and it was not until around 2010 that Moritomo finally regained his voice, he then began a solo career. After hearing fans wishing for the group to reform however, Moritomo and the rest of T-Bolan agreed to reunite in late 2012 and are set to go on a nationwide tour of 16 cities beginning in October 2012.

Members
Arashi Morimoto (森友嵐士) - vocalist, lyricist, composer, arranger
Takashi Gomi (五味孝氏) - guitarist, composer, arranger
Hirofumi Ueno (上野博文) - bassist, arranger
Kazuyoshi Aoki (青木和義) - drummer, leader, arranger

Discography

Singles

Studio albums

Compilation albums

Best albums

References

External links
Official Website 

Japanese rock music groups
Musical quartets
Being Inc. artists
Musical groups from Tokyo
Musical groups established in 1991